The Padel World Championship is an international competition of padel that has been held every second year since 1992. The first edition was held in Spain. The event is organized by the International Padel Federation and includes both male and female competitions.

Winners by year

National teams

Men's teams

Women's teams

Pairs

Men's pairs

Women's pairs

Wins by player

Men

Women

Teams medal table

Men's teams

Women's teams

References

External links
2013 World Padel Championship
2012 XI Padel World Championships - Pairs
History of the Padel World Championship

Recurring sporting events established in 1992
Padel